Platynematichthys notatus, the coroatá or striped catfish, is a species of catfish (order Siluriformes) of the monotypic genus Platynematichthys of the family Pimelodidae. It is native to the Amazon and Orinoco basins in South America.

Platynematichthys and its sister group Brachyplatystoma are the only genera in the tribe Brachyplatystomatini. These two genera are characterized by two synapomorphies; these include a gas bladder divided into an anterior portion and a triangular posterior portion, as well as a ventral crest under the cleithrum, the main bone supporting the pectoral fins.

References

Pimelodidae
Freshwater fish of Brazil
Freshwater fish of Colombia
Fish of Venezuela
Fish of the Amazon basin
Taxa named by Pieter Bleeker
Taxa named by Sir William Jardine
Monotypic ray-finned fish genera